John Kwasi Annin was a Ghanaian politician in the first republic. He was the member of parliament for the Ahafo Ano constituency from 1965 to 1966.

See also
 List of MPs elected in the 1965 Ghanaian parliamentary election

References

Date of birth missing
Date of death missing
Ghanaian MPs 1965–1966
Convention People's Party (Ghana) politicians
20th-century Ghanaian politicians